The Faithful Heart is a 1932 British drama film directed by Victor Saville and starring Herbert Marshall, Edna Best and Anne Grey. It is based on the 1921 play The Faithful Heart by Monckton Hoffe.

It was made at Islington Studios of Gainsborough Pictures in London. The film's sets were designed by Alex Vetchinsky.

Plot
At the turn of the century, a young waitress has a fling with a sailor on leave. He then departs for South Africa to fight in the Boer War and enjoys a distinguished career and is awarded a Victoria Cross for heroics in the First World War. Engaged to a high society heiress, his new status is changed by the sudden arrival of his long-lost daughter, the identical image of her now-deceased mother.

Cast
 Herbert Marshall as Waverly Ango
 Edna Best as Blackie Anderway / Blackie's Daughter
 Mignon O'Doherty as Miss Gattiscombe
 Laurence Hanray as Major Ango
 Anne Grey as Diana
 Athole Stewart as Sir Gilbert Oughterson

References

Bibliography
 Wood, Linda. British Films, 1927-1939. British Film Institute, 1986.

External links

1932 films
Films based on works by Monckton Hoffe
Films directed by Victor Saville
Gainsborough Pictures films
Islington Studios films
Films set in London
Films set in the 1890s
Seafaring films
British historical drama films
1930s historical drama films
British black-and-white films
Films with screenplays by Victor Saville
1932 drama films
1930s English-language films
1930s British films